Dolly Ki Doli is a 2015 Indian Hindi-language comedy-drama film, directed by debutant Abhishek Dogra and produced by actor Arbaaz Khan under his production house Arbaaz Khan Productions. The film stars Sonam Kapoor in the title role and also features Pulkit Samrat, Rajkummar Rao and Varun Sharma. The film was released on 23 January 2015. The film's trailer was unveiled on Malaika's and Arbaaz's anniversary in December 2014. It is a remake of the 2013 Punjabi film R.S.V.P. - Ronde Saare Vyah Picho.

Though the film was an average grosser, Kapoor's performance was praised, earning her a Best Actress nomination at the 61st Filmfare Awards.

Plot
The film centres around a young woman, Dolly (Sonam Kapoor), who is a con artist. She marries men from different religions and runs away with their wealth on the night of the wedding with their money.
Her entire family consists of con artists. The first man she cons is Sonu Sherawat (Rajkummar Rao). After conning a number of rich men, she gets media attention, who label her as a "looteri dulhan" (bride thief). Officer Robin Singh (Pulkit Samrat) is assigned the duty to catch Dolly. When she tries to con an innocent Delhi boy Manjot (Varun Sharma), she mistakenly lets people take a picture of her which are then splashed all over the media, forcing them to hide from public for a few months.

After 6 months, when Dolly and her gang again try to con Prince Aditya Singh (Saif Ali Khan), who recently came from abroad, they are arrested by Robin Singh. Then it is revealed that Robin Singh and Dolly have a past which provoked Dolly to be a con artist in the first place. She is put behind bars but she escapes with Robin's help and they get married. But she leaves him too and regroups with her old gang members and goes in search of their next victim.

Cast
 Sonam Kapoor as Dolly Singh/Dolly Dubey/Madhuri Chawla/Bhagyashree/Priya/Kisi Kaam ki Nahin Nalli
 Pulkit Samrat as Inspector Robin Singh
 Rajkummar Rao as Sonu Sherawat
 Varun Sharma as Manjot Singh Chadda
 Dilraj Singh Hada as Peter 
 Mohammed Zeeshan Ayyub as Jagdish “Raju” Dubey/Jagdish Singh, Dolly's fake brother
 Manoj Joshi as Dubeyji/Major SK Singh, Dolly's fake father
 Rajesh Sharma as Ramesh Sherawat, Sonu's Father
 Gulfam Khan as Sonu's Mother
 Archana Puran Singh as Manjot's Mother
Mubeen Saudagar as Ibrahim
 Brijendra Kala as Sub-Inspector Khan
 Vibha Chibber as Commissioner Kiran Chaudhary 
 Saif Ali Khan in a cameo appearance as Prince Aditya Singh
 Malaika Arora Khan in a special appearance in the song "Fashion Khatam Muhjpe"

Soundtrack

Reception

The film received mixed reviews from critics.
Bollywood Hungama described the film "a solid entertainer that will surely entertain the masses and classes alike" and gave it 4.5 out of 5 stars.

In its first Friday, it collected 20 million, a result which Koimoi called "poor". At the end of its second weekend, it had collected 192.1 million, performing well in the north, but failing in multiplexes and single screens.

References

External links

2015 films
2010s Hindi-language films
2015 comedy-drama films
Films about Indian weddings
Films shot in Mandawa
Films scored by Sanjoy Chowdhury
Indian comedy-drama films
2015 directorial debut films